Michael A. Wartell (born November 4, 1946) is chancellor emeritus of Indiana University-Purdue University Fort Wayne (IPFW), where he served as the eighth chancellor from 1994 to 2012.  His 18 years of service was the longest tenure of any previous chancellor. Prior to this appointment, he served as IPFW's vice chancellor for academic affairs for one year.

Personal background
Wartell was born in Albuquerque, New Mexico. He received a B.S. in chemistry from the University of New Mexico in 1967 and an M.S. and Ph.D. in physical chemistry from Yale University in 1968 and 1971, respectively. He is married to Ruth, and they have two sons, Justin and Richard.

Career

Science
Between 1989–93, Wartell was a department manager for Sandia National Laboratories in Albuquerque, New Mexico His responsibilities included development and management of educational outreach and special technologies programs.

Academia
Wartell began his career as an assistant professor of chemistry at Metropolitan State College of Denver in 1971, where he was promoted to associate professor of chemistry and served as the department chair between 1975–78. He was the dean of the School of Natural Sciences and Mathematics as well as professor of chemistry at Slippery Rock University in Slippery Rock, Pennsylvania, during the 1978–79 academic year. Between 1979–84, Wartell was the dean of the College of Letters and Sciences and professor of chemistry at James Madison University in Harrisonburg, Virginia. He made a cross-country move to Humboldt State University in Arcata, California, to become the provost and vice president for academic affairs and professor of chemistry between 1984–89. He returned to the private sector and Sandia National Laboratories for approximately four years before re-entering academia at IPFW.

Government service
He currently serves on the board of the Army War College, and chairs its educational advisory committee.  Previously, he served on the U.S. Army Science Board (1981–87 and 1997–2010), working on such subjects as chemical warfare, manpower and logistics, and decontamination. He also served on the Department of Defense's Defense Science Board (1998–2005) and as chair of the Defense Intelligence Agency Science and Technology Advisory Board (1987–2005). He was a member and chair of the board of visitors of the Defense Systems Management College (1984–88), and he has been a consultant to government agencies and defense contractors.

Community leadership
He is a member of the board of directors of the Greater Fort Wayne Chamber of Commerce, Corporate Council; Leadership Fort Wayne; Junior Achievement; the Urban League; the Boy Scouts of America, Anthony Wayne Area Council; the Northeast Indiana Innovation Center; and the Fort Wayne Philharmonic.

Accolades
Wartell is the recipient of a Sagamore of the Wabash, Indiana's second-highest civilian honor for service to the state. He is also a member of numerous honorary societies such as Phi Beta Kappa, Phi Kappa Phi, and Kappa Mu Epsilon and a recipient of major research grants in excess of $10 million in chemistry and science education.

Indiana University–Purdue University Fort Wayne
As chancellor, Wartell was responsible for Indiana's fifth-largest university and the only comprehensive public university in northeast Indiana. The Wartell administration developed and administered two successful five-year strategic plans.

Under Wartell, the university pursued its most aggressive building construction efforts in its history. His leadership was responsible for the construction of Parking Garage 2, the Science Building, the PLEX indoor soccer building and the Hefner Soccer Fields (12 outdoor soccer fields), the Willis Family Bridge between the main campus and the residential campus, IPFW Student Housing on the Waterfield Campus (stages I–III), the Rhinehart Music Center, the Holiday Inn at IPFW and the Coliseum, the Ron Venderly Family Bridge spanning the St. Joseph River between the Main Campus and West Campus, the Medical Education Center, and the Student Services Complex.

Also during Wartell's tenure, IPFW's endowment and level of public and private funding significantly increased to previously unprecedented levels. The endowment rose from $3 million to $56 million.  In support of various projects, Wartell raised more than $100 million from external sources.  The Wartell administration also ushered its 16 men's and women's sports into NCAA Division I athletic competition, and membership in The Summit League conference.

Wartell was forced to leave IPFW in 2012 in accordance with Purdue University's mandatory retirement age policy. In a lawsuit settled in early 2015, Wartell said that this policy had not been enforced before and that he was the victim of gender discrimination and a breach of contract.

External links
Wartell biography

References

Indiana University – Purdue University Fort Wayne people
1946 births
Living people
University of New Mexico alumni
Yale Graduate School of Arts and Sciences alumni
Sandia National Laboratories people
People from Albuquerque, New Mexico